Ormenio is the northernmost place in all of Greece. It is part of the municipal unit of Trigono in the Evros regional unit of Thrace. It is situated near the right bank of the river Evros, which forms the border with Bulgaria here. On the other side of the Evros, 6 km to the north, lies the Bulgarian town Svilengrad. Nearby villages in Greece are Ptelea to its southeast and Petrota to its southwest.

History
In 1371 Ormenio was the site of the Battle of Maritsa in which the Serb army under Ivan Uglesha and Vukashin was decisively defeated by the Ottomans. It was known as "Çirmen" during Ottoman rule and was a sanjak centre until 1829. In 1878 it was inhabited by 870 Bulgarians and 120 Muslims. After the Balkan Wars, the village was annexed to Bulgaria as "Chernomen" until 1919, when the village was ceded to Greece in the Treaty of Neuilly. In 1997 under the Kapodistrias reform, the community of Ormenio became part of the new municipality of Trigono with 12 other former communities. At the 2011 Kallikratis reform Trigono became a municipal unit of the municipality Orestiada.

Population

Transport

Road
Ormenio is bypassed by the Greek National Road 51/European route E85 (Feres - Soufli - Orestiada - Ormenio), which continues across the border as the Bulgarian road 80 to Svilengrad.

Rail
The community is served by Ormenio railway station, the most northernly railway station in Greece and the terminal for (the Greek portion) the Alexandroupoli–Svilengrad line. There is currently no rail connection to Svilengrad via Ormenio. Ormenio had a railway station on the line from Didymoteicho to Harmanli in Bulgaria. During the Ottoman era, Ormenio was called Çirmen in Turkish.

Notable locals 
 Flavius Belisarius, the famous Roman general, was born in Germen, the Roman precursor of Ormenio.

See also
List of settlements in the Evros regional unit

References

External links
Ormenio on GTP Travel Pages

Bulgaria–Greece border crossings
Populated places in Evros (regional unit)